Rustam Ali is a Bangladeshi politician. He is a member of the Bangladesh Nationalist Party. He was elected a member of parliament from Rangpur-21 in 1979 Bangladeshi general election.

Career 
Rustam Ali was elected a Member of Parliament from Rangpur-21 constituency as a Bangladesh Nationalist Party candidate in the 1979 Bangladeshi general election.

References 

Living people
Year of birth missing (living people)
Bangladesh Nationalist Party politicians
2nd Jatiya Sangsad members